Hjørring Baptist Church is a Christian Baptist Church, which is located on Sct. Olai Plads in the center of Hjørring, Denmark.

The church is a part of the Baptist World Alliance.

External links 
Hjørring Baptist Church
The Baptist Church of Denmark
Baptist World Alliance

Baptist churches in Europe
Buildings and structures in Hjørring Municipality
Churches in the North Jutland Region